General elections were held in Mexico on 6 July 1958. The presidential elections were won by Adolfo López Mateos, who received 90.4% of the vote. In the Chamber of Deputies election, the Institutional Revolutionary Party won 153 of the 162 seats. These were the first Mexican presidential elections in which women were allowed to vote.

Campaign
During a campaign stop at the municipality of Jalpa, the presidential candidate of the National Action Party, Luis H. Álvarez, was arrested and imprisoned for a couple of hours; according to Álvarez, the charge that was brought against him was "being a member of the opposition".

Results

President

Chamber of Deputies

References

Presidential elections in Mexico
Mexico
General
Legislative elections in Mexico
Mexican general election
Election and referendum articles with incomplete results